Grady High School may refer to:

 Grady High School (Arkansas) (closed) — Grady, Arkansas, Grady School District
Henry W. Grady High School — Atlanta, Georgia
Grady High School (New Mexico) — Grady, New Mexico
H. Grady Spruce High School — Dallas, Texas
Grady High School — Lenorah, Texas, Grady Independent School District
William E. Grady High School — New York City, New York